Anjan is a given name. Notable people with the name include:

 Anjan Bista (born 1998), Nepalese footballer
 Anjan Chakravartty, American philosopher
 Anjan Chatterjee (born 1960), Indian hotelier and founder of Speciality Group of Restaurants
 Anjan Chatterjee (neuroscientist) (born 1958), Indian-American neurologist
 Anjan Chattopadhyay, Bengali sitar player
 Anjan Choudhury (1944–2007), Bengali filmmaker
 Anjan Das (1949–2014), Bengali film director
 Anjan Dutt (born 1953), Bengali singer, composer and film director
 Anjan Dutta (politician) (born 1952), Indian politician
 Anjan Lahiri, Indian-American businessman
 Anjan Mukherjee, American businessman
 Aanjjan Srivastav (born 1948)
 Anjan Sundaram, Indian-American journalist
 Anjan Kumar Yadav (born 1961), Indian politician

See also
 A. R. Anjan Umma (born 1955), Sri Lankan politician and teacher
 Atul Kumar Anjan, Indian politician
 Zahidur Rahman Anjan, Bangladeshi film director